The 3 arrondissements of the Orne department are:
 Arrondissement of Alençon, (prefecture of the Orne department: Alençon) with 111 communes. The population of the arrondissement was 86,907 in 2016.  
 Arrondissement of Argentan, (subprefecture: Argentan) with 123 communes.  The population of the arrondissement was 110,239 in 2016.  
 Arrondissement of Mortagne-au-Perche, (subprefecture: Mortagne-au-Perche) with 151 communes.  The population of the arrondissement was 88,162 in 2016.

History

In 1800 the arrondissements of Alençon, Argentan, Domfront and Mortagne-au-Perche were established. The arrondissements of Domfront and Mortagne-au-Perche were disbanded in 1926, and Then, Mortagne-au-Perche was restored in 1942. 

The borders of the arrondissements of Orne were modified in January 2017:
 11 communes from the arrondissement of Alençon to the arrondissement of Argentan
 one commune from the arrondissement of Alençon to the arrondissement of Mortagne-au-Perche
 nine communes from the arrondissement of Argentan to the arrondissement of Alençon
 49 communes from the arrondissement of Argentan to the arrondissement of Mortagne-au-Perche
 five communes from the arrondissement of Mortagne-au-Perche to the arrondissement of Alençon

References

Orne